The University of International Business and Economics (UIBE;  abbr. 贸大, Mào Dà),  is a public research university specialized in undergraduate and graduate education in economics, finance, international business, management, business, law, foreign languages and foreign relations. Established in 1951 in Beijing by China's Ministry of Foreign Trade and Economic Cooperation, it is one of the elite Chinese universities and one of the most competitive and selective universities to enter for undergraduate education in China.

The University of International Business and Economics is a first-tier public research institution within the national key university Double First Class University Plan, the former 985 Innovative Platforms for Key Disciplines Project, and the former Project 211 and thus receives special support and endorsement from the Chinese government. UIBE is widely considered to be the leading Chinese university of economics, finance, international business, and foreign languages. As of 2020, it ranked No. 3 among China universities specialized in finance, business, and economics in the recent edition of the widely recognized Best Chinese Universities Ranking.

In 2015, UIBE had 12,760 students enrolled from China and 3,334 international students from 148 countries and regions. It receives direct dual administration from the Ministry of Education and the Ministry of Commerce of the People's Republic of China. 

UIBE is ranked 101-200th in WURI Global Top 100 Innovative Universities Ranking 2021.

History
The university was founded in 1951 as the Beijing Institute of Foreign Trade. It provided education and training for government officials responsible for China’s economic and international business administration under the leadership of the Ministry of Foreign Trade and Economic Cooperation and Ministry of Education. It was first designated as a key university by the Chinese government as early as 1960 for its outstanding academic programs, and then designated as a national key university in 1978 after suspension in the Cultural Revolution. Following the onset of Chinese economic reform under Deng Xiaoping, UIBE witnessed unprecedented development and expansion, and in 1984 was renamed the current name, University of International Business and Economics. In May 1997 UIBE was put on the list of "Project 211" universities of the first batch. In the year of 2000, UIBE has become one of the state universities under the leadership of the Ministry of Education, and in June of the same year it merged with China Institute of Finance, from then on, it has become one of the leaders not only in the studies of economics, business management and law, but also in finance. UIBE is included in the state Double First Class University Plan, a program designed by the Chinese central government aimed at turning about 147 Chinese universities into exceptionally world-class academic institutions by 2050.

Faculty
The university offer a range of courses in international business, economics, international trade, finance, management, commercial law, foreign languages and related fields.

The university has traditionally had a reputation as a training ground for top civil servants in the Ministry of Commerce (previously known as Ministry of Foreign Trade, Ministry of Foreign Economic Relations and Trade and Ministry of Foreign Trade and Economic Cooperation) under the government of the People's Republic of China. Until 1989, graduates went to work either for the Ministry or the many state-owned import/export companies throughout the country.

UIBE is the home of The Beijing Center, a program for mainly American students studying in China who reside at UIBE and take Chinese language courses, as well as other courses taught in English, by a vast array of professors from Beijing's top universities.

Academic rankings and reputation
As of 2020, it ranked no.3 among universities specialized in finance, business, and economics in the recent edition of the widely recognized Best Chinese Universities Ranking. The institution is typically on first or second place in the fields of economics, finance, and international business in a ranking among 300 Chinese universities.

In 2010 Forbes China ranked 45 Chinese business schools, many of them part of the country's top universities receiving substantial governmental support, according to salary performance and return on investment of graduates of their MBA and Executive MBA programs. UIBE's EMBA program reached rank 10, while its full-time MBA program rounded out the top 15. In a similar rating of part-time MBA programs conducted by the magazine in 2012, UIBE reached rank 13.

In the 2022 Academic Ranking of World Universities (ARWU) by Subjects, UIBE ranked in the global top # 101 in "Finance", the global top #151 in "Business Administration" & " Economics" and the global top # 201 in "Management".

Entry standards ranking
UIBE is one of the most competitive and selective universities to enter for undergraduate education in China after students passed the National Higher Education Entrance Examination. In 2013 the institution ranked 14th both in comprehensive measurement and for admission into science study programs, and 8th for liberal arts (which in China traditionally include economics-related subjects), according to the Center for Higher Education Studies of Renmin University of China.

Schools and departments

School of International Trade and Economics
Department of International Trade
Department of Finance
Department of Economics
Department of Transportation and Logistics
Department of Political Economy
Department of International Economic Cooperation
Department of Mathematical and Quantitative Economics

The School of International Trade and Economics is one of China's leading centers for the study and research of international trade and finance. The School is an established, research-intensive institution including seven departments and ten research centers.

School of Banking and Finance
Department of Banking
Department of Financial Engineering
Department of Investment

In 2001, the School of Banking and Finance in UIBE merged with the former China Institution of Finance which was widely known as the undergraduate school of the Peoples' Bank of China and received endorsement from the Chinese central government. Currently, about 1500 students are studying in SBF, with 950 being undergraduates, 179 graduates, and 33 doctoral graduates, including more than 100 foreign students. The school also has roughly 300 graduate students, specialized in finance, studying as part-time students.

School of Business
Department of International Business Administration
Department of Accounting
Department of Corporate Finance
Department of Human Resources Management
Department of Marketing
Department of Statistics

The Business School at the University of International Business Economics (hereafter UIBEBS) was established in 1982 as Department of International Business Management. It is now the second largest among 16 schools on the campus in terms of enrollment and faculty team.  Teaching and research at UIBEBS covers virtually all facets of business management with programmes in accounting, finance, marketing, business management and human resource management. UIBEBS uses textbooks and teaching materials from the United States in courses taught in English. The business school is currently [as of May 2014] a member of the Association to Advance Collegiate Schools of Business (AACSB) as well as European Quality Improvement System (EQUIS). By the end of 2013, UIBEBS has 87 full-time and 31 part-time faculties, 2499 full-time and 1060 part-time students. Of the total number, 597 are international students.

School of Law
Department of International Law
Department of Civil Law
Department of Economic Law

Founded in 1984, the University of International Business and Economics (UIBE) School of Law features a State-approved key discipline of international law and has around 50 full-time faculty members.  Half of the full-time faculty have served as arbitrators of various domestic and foreign arbitration institutions.  In 2010, UIBE ranks second in China’s National Higher Education Institution Rankings by Employment Rate.  The university has enrolled many foreign students.

School of Foreign Studies
Department of Arabian
Department of Korean
Department of German
Department of Russian
Department of Japanese
Department of French
Department of Italian
Department of Spanish
Department of Vietnamese
Department of Portuguese 
Department of Persian
Department of Modern Greek

The School of Foreign Studies (SFS), originally the second Department of the Beijing Foreign Trade College founded in 1954, is composed of eight departments and one centre, namely, Departments of Arabic, French, Italian, Japanese, Korean, Spanish, Russian, and Vietnamese, as well as the Sino-Italian Language Training Centre. In its history of half a century, there appeared many known scholars and professors: Chen Tao, Song Wenjun, Shen Daming, Zhang Xiongwu, Zhao Run, Jiang Xindao, Xiao Tianyou, among others.
Up till now, the school has produced about 1,000 undergraduates and 100 post graduates.  Prominent among them:  Shi Guangsheng as the ex-minister of Foreign Trades, Song Hai, now the vice provincial governor of Guangdong Province, Cao Weizhou, the deputy Secretary-General of the National Standing Committee of People’s Congress of China, Guo Li, the deputy director of the Hong Kong Liaison Office of China.
The eight departments of the School are all members and/or standing members of their separate National Teaching Associations and Literature Societies.
The faculty consists of 21 full professors and 33 associate professors. Among them, 34 are graduate supervisors, 21 have obtained PhD degrees. The SFS also employs some foreign teachers.
There are 700 undergraduate and 100 postgraduate students enrolled.  The school has exchange programs with 20 overseas universities.

School of International Studies
Department of English Linguistics and Literature
Department of Business English
Department of Translation and Interpretation
Department of General English

School of International Education (SIE) of UIBE is engaged in recruiting international students for UIBE’s degree and non-degree study programs, and provides related services.  SIE offers language training programs, including the Chinese Language and Business Chinese at different levels, and Advance Studies on Chinese Economy and Culture.

Currently, there are more than 3,100 foreign students from 126 countries and regions studying at the University of International Business and Economics.  Over 2,300 of them are taking degree courses and over 800 students are taking Chinese language courses and non-degree courses.

School of International Education has Dean's Office, Admissions Office, Office for Degree Education, Office for Non-Degree Education, Department of Students' Affairs, Department of Teaching and Service Center.

School of Information Technology and Management Engineering
Department of Information Management
Department of Electronic Business
Department of Computer Software Application
School of International Relations
Department of Political Science
Department of International Politics
Department of International Political Economy
Department of Diplomacy

Research Institute for Global Value Chains

School of Public Administration

School of Insurance and Economics

School of Chinese and Literature

Sino-French International Management School

Zhuoyue International School

China Institute for WTO Studies

Institute of International Economics

School of Distance Education

School of Executive Development

Campus

Buildings
The campus has been nicknamed "Hui Garden". Seven buildings are either dormitories or classroom buildings. There is a major academic building at the northwest of the site, which used to belong to the China Institute of Finance, named Boxue. Another modern teaching building is located in the southeastern corner, named Ningyuan. There is also an imposing structure in the middle of the campus, named Chengxin. A new library building was opened in October 2008.

Apart from the sports areas, there is a Chinese garden (south side), a bird cage, and a pond dubbed the "Back Sea" (see Houhai) by students.

The University recently hired a foreign branding expert – Alexander Goldsborough – as Director of International Marketing and Communications, to revisit the brand image of the University.

Israel campus
In August 2021 UIBE opened a new campus in Petah Tikvah in Israel, in a ceremony that was attended by UIBE's Party Chief Jiang Qingzhe, UIBE's President Xia Wenbin, Israeli Ambassador to China Matan Vilnai and Petah Tikva's Mayor Rami Greenberg.

Notable Figures

Alumni
Dou Jianzhong – Executive Director and Chairman, CITIC Limited(中信股份)
Gao Xiaoli – Judge (2022-2026) of United Nations Appeals Tribunal, and Chief Judge of 4th Civil Division, Supreme Court of China(最高人民法院)
Gao Xiqing – CEO of China Investment Corporation, one of the largest SWFs in the World, former vice President of National Social Security Fund (NSSF), former Vice President of China Securities Regulatory Commission(CSRC)
Geng Xin – CEO of Daiwa Securities (China)(大和証券-中国)
Gong Zheng – Mayor of Shanghai and former Governor of Shandong
Gu Yongjiang – Former Chairman of China Resources
He Weiwen – Senior Fellow of Chongyang Institute for Financial Studies, Renmin University of China (RDCY) and Vice Chairman of Global Alliance of SMEs
Hong Hao – Managing Director and Head of Research at BOCOM International, Former Chief Global Equity Strategist and Executive Director at CICC (Beijing, Hong Kong), and Global Strategist at Morgan Stanley (Sydney, New York) and at Citigroup (New York, London), named as the “Most Accurate Strategist in China” by Bloomberg.
Huang Tao – Senior Partner and the Managing Partner of the Dispute Resolution Group of King & Wood Mallesons
Jiang Wei – Former CFO of China Resources
Jiao Jinhong – Chief Legal Counsel of the China Securities Regulatory Commission(证监会)
Li Jinyan – Interim Dean (2009-2010), Full Professor, Osgoode Hall Law School, York University, Canada
Li Shu() – Partner at the Boston Consulting Group
Li Xiang – Chinese actress, host and singer
Lin (Kevin) Chaolun –Lead Interpreter (Chinese) of the Foreign Office of the British Government
Lin Jianhai –  first-ever Secretary of International Monetary Fund(IMF) from China
Liu Guixiang –Grand Justice of the second rank, and Judicial Committee Member of Supreme Court of China(最高人民法院)
Liu Jinbao() –Former CEO of Bank of China (Hong Kong)
Lu Xiaoqiang – Managing Director of Deutsche Bank AG, former Director of Citigroup AG
Chrissy Luo() – Co-founder of Shanda Group and the Caltech Tianqiao and Chrissy Chen Institute
Qi Huanwu – the former Ambassador of Poland to people’s Republic of China
Qian Feng – Deputy Minister of Ministry of Veterans Affairs（退伍军人事务部） and Former Deputy Director of Legislative Affairs Office（国务院法制办）, State Council of People’s Republic of China
Qiu Zhongqiang – Global Vice President & Asia Senior Vice President of Procter & Gamble Company (P&G)
Weijian Shan – CEO of PAG Group, former professor at Wharton Business School of the University of Pennsylvania, former Managing Director of JPMorgan Chase, former Partner at TPG Capital
Shi Guangsheng – former Minister of China Foreign Trade and Economic Cooperation
Sun Yonghong – Managing Director of Standard Chartered Bank AG, former Executive Director of JPMorgan Chase AG, former Executive Director of Goldman Sachs AG
Sun Zhenyu –  Ambassador and Permanent Representative of China to the WTO from 2002 to 2010
Wang Guiying – Deputy Governor of Shandong Province 
Wang Jinlong – President of Starbucks AP, Senior Vice President of Starbucks International
Wang Shouwen() – Vice Minister of the Ministry of Commerce, Deputy China International Trade Representative
Wang Lingjun() – Vice Minister and Deputy Customs Commissioner-General,of the General Administration of Customs of China (海关总署)
Wang Xuebing() – former Chairman at Bank of China, former Chairman at China Construction Bank
Wu Weijun – the first man in Mainland China who obtained the membership of ACCA, and also a Deloitte China Vice Chairman
Jing Zhang() – MD, China Chief Legal Counsel of Goldman Sachs
Yang Fuchang – former Vice Minister, Ministry of Foreign Affairs of PRC, and former President of China Foreign Affairs University (外交学院)
Yang Jingyu – former Chair of Law Committee of National People's Congress, China(全国人大法律委员会) and former Director of Legislative Affairs Office（国务院法制办), State Council of People’s Republic of China
Yong Mei – Chinese actress, winner of Silver Bear for Best Actress at the 69th Berlin International Film Festival
Yu Xubao – Chairman of COFCO
Windy Yuan – a successful entrepreneur and a community activist in Canada, now the President and CEO of Bradley Pacific Enterprises
Zhang Jixun – Professor at Japan Josai University
Zhang Libin – Partner of Baker Botts L.L.P.
Zhang Liping – Chairman, Greater China of Blackstone
Zhang Yi –Chairman of China Management Committee, King & Wood Mallesons
Zhang Zhiwei – Chief China Economist at Deutsche Bank
Zhao Zhongxiu – President of UIBE (since Jan.2023), former President of Shandong University of Finance and Economics
Zhou Keren – Former Vice Minister of Foreign Trade and Economic Cooperation
Zhou Wenzhong – Former Ambassador of the People's Republic of China to the United States of America from 2005 to 2010

Professor
Ba Shusong
Fred Engst
Shi Jingxia
Wang Linsheng
Xue Rongjiu

Foreign students
UIBE was one of the first Chinese universities to admit foreign students, with the first group enrolling in 1954.

Over 70% of the foreign student population hails from the Republic of Korea (South Korea). Students from the DPRK, (North Korea), however, despite that country's proximity to China, are very rare. Recently, there has been an influx of Western European (Finland, France, Germany, Italy) and North American students. Japanese, Indonesian, Vietnamese and Thai students also account for a sizable proportion of foreign students.

Since 1998, the UIBE and Reims Management School have created a Franco-Chinese undergraduate program CESEM. It also has an exchange agreement for Spanish students with the Comillas Pontifical University. Other dual diplomas partners are Paris-based business school ESCE and Cardiff University.

UIBE is one of the first universities in China to launch an international student program taught entirely in English. This program has become very popular among foreign students both in China and outside.

References

External links

  Official website
  Official international website
  School of International Trade and Economics, UIBE
  CESEM, Neoma Bs
 (in English) Research Institute for Global Value Chains
 Some photos of UIBE (CC)

Universities and colleges in Beijing
Project 211
Educational institutions established in 1951
1951 establishments in China
 
Schools in Chaoyang District, Beijing